Sarah Reed may refer to:
Sarah Reed (footballer) (born 1980), English footballer
 Sarah Reed (musician), American musician, singer, and guitarist
 Sarah Reed (prisoner), British prisoner who died while on remand
 Sarah Towles Reed, American teacher and labor activist

See also
 Sarah T. Reed High School, New Orleans, Louisiana
 Sarah Reid (disambiguation)